was a railway station on the Sekihoku Main Line in Engaru, Hokkaido, Japan, operated by Hokkaido Railway Company (JR Hokkaido). Opened in October 1932, the station closed in March 2016.

Lines

The station was numbered "A44".

By December 2012, the station was served by just one train service in each direction daily.

Station layout
The station had a single side platform serving the single-track line. The station was unstaffed, but a station structure was provided, with toilet facilities for passengers.

Adjacent stations

History
The station opened on 1 October 1932. With the privatization of Japanese National Railways (JNR) on 1 April 1987, the station came under the control of JR Hokkaido.

In July 2015, JR Hokkaido announced that it would be closing the station along with three others on the line (Kyū-Shirataki Station, Shimo-Shirataki Station, and Kanehana Station) in March 2016, due to low passenger usage.

In January 2016, it was reported on Chinese state broadcaster CCTV's Facebook page that the station was being kept open for the benefit of just one high-school girl who used the station to commute to and from school, and that it was scheduled to close when the girl graduated. However, it was later revealed that the station in question was actually Kyū-Shirataki Station, two stops away, and there is no evidence that the timing of the closure of either station was connected with the girl's graduation.

The station closed following the last day of services on 25 March 2016.

Surrounding area
 National Route 333

See also
 List of railway stations in Japan

References

External links

 JR Hokkaido Station information 

Railway stations in Hokkaido Prefecture
Stations of Hokkaido Railway Company
Railway stations in Japan opened in 1932
Railway stations closed in 2016
2016 disestablishments in Japan